Erik Stenlund (born 26 May 1962) is a former speedway rider from Sweden.

Speedway career 
Stenlund is a two times world champion at the Individual Ice Speedway World Championship (1984 & 1988) and a former champion of Sweden, winning the Swedish Championship in 1985.

He rode in the top tier of British Speedway for three seasons in 1982, 1988 and 1996, riding for various clubs.

World final appearances

World Longtrack Championship
 1989  Marianske Lazne 4th 28pts
 1990  Herxheim 7th 21pts
 1991  Marianske Lazne 14th 4pts
 1993  Mühldorf 17th 2pts

Ice World Championship
1981  Assen 11th 9pts
1982  Inzell 15th
1983  Eindhoven 3rd 24pts
1984  Moscowchampion 29pts
1985  Assen 4th 25pts
1986  Stockholm 3rd 25pts 
1988  Eindhoven champion 29pts

References 

1962 births
Living people
Swedish speedway riders
Poole Pirates riders
Reading Racers riders
Swindon Robins riders
Sportspeople from Uppsala